Şehitlik can refer to:

 Şehitlik, Pazaryolu
 Şehitlik Mosque
 Şehitlik, Artvin
 Şehitlik railway station